The Center for Business and Economic Research (CBER), formerly the Bureau of Business Research, is an economic policy and forecasting research center housed within the Miller College of Business at Ball State University in Muncie, Indiana, USA. CBER research encompasses health care, public finance, regional economics, transportation, and energy sector studies. In addition to research, CBER serves as the forecasting element in the Muncie area – hosting five state and federal economic forecasting roundtables.

History
The Center for Business and Economic Research was founded the late 1960s as the Bureau of Business Research at Ball State University. The founding was initiated by Dr. Robert P. Bell soon after being hired as the first dean of the College of Business. Dr. Joseph Brown from the University of Georgia became the first director of the bureau. The focus of the bureau was to look for research opportunities and provide faculty with help pursuing those opportunities. Also, focus was placed on using faculty in applied business research.

The focus of the center has changed significantly since its inception. An official name change from the Bureau of Business Research to the Center for Business and Economic Research occurred in 2008. Currently, the center works in the community through services of economic policy research, national, state, and local forecasting, and data analysis.

Recent studies
CBER regularly releases studies and publications on various topics including health care, public finance, regional economics, transportation, and energy.

Publications

American Journal of Business
CBER houses the managing office of the American Journal of Business, a peer-reviewed journal that publishes articles aimed at improving business practices or enhancing instructional efforts through application, transfer, and interpretation of knowledge.

Indiana Business Bulletin
CBER also publishes the online publication, Indiana Business Bulletin (IBB). The IBB provides weekly economic analysis, forecasting, and leading economic indicators to the business community, media, and policymakers.

Awards and recognitions

 2009 Association for University Business and Economic Research (AUBER) Award of Excellence in Websites for CBER Data Center – County Profiles
 2009 AUBER Award of Excellence in Newsletters, Brochures and Other Promotional Materials for CBER Open House
 2009 AUBER Award of Excellence in Special Studies, Technical or Contract Reports for Local Government Reform in Indiana
 2008 AUBER Award of Excellence in Electronic Publications for State of Manufacturing and Logistics in Indiana

References

External links 
CBER Website
Indiana Business Bulletin
American Journal of Business

Business economics
Forecasting organizations